Schooley's Mountain Historic District is a historic district along Schooley's Mountain, Pleasant Grove, and Flocktown Roads, and Heath Lane in the Schooley's Mountain section of Washington Township, Morris County, New Jersey. It was added to the National Register of Historic Places on June 14, 1991 for its significance in architecture, entertainment/recreation, and health/medicine. The district includes 71 contributing buildings, such as the Oak Cottage, site of schoolhouse No. 5, Schooley's Mountain Store, the William W. Marsh House, Christadelphian Bible Camp, the former Heath House Hotel, former Forest Grove Hydropathic Institute, Mine Hill Farm, the Marsh Mine and several private residences and commercial buildings.

History
The area grew as a nineteenth century summer resort built around a mineral spring on Schooley's Mountain near a brook that flowed to the Musconetcong River. Schooley's Mountain Springs were rich in iron, termed chalybeate, and said to have healing powers.

Description
The Presbyterian Church on Heath Lane was built in 1870 and has a three story bell tower. The William W. Marsh House at 13 Heath Lane was built  with Italianate style and is now used by the Liebenzell Mission and named Eben-Ezer. The Strawbridge House at 2 Pleasant Grove Road was built , also with Italianate style. The Terriberry House at 4 Pleasant Grove Road was built with Shingle style architecture. The gentleman's farmhouse at 18 Pleasant Grove Road was built  and remodeled  in Neoclassical style. It was once a stop on the stagecoach line between Morristown and Easton.

Gallery of contributing properties

See also
National Register of Historic Places listings in Morris County, New Jersey

References

External links
 
 

Washington Township, Morris County, New Jersey
National Register of Historic Places in Morris County, New Jersey
New Jersey Register of Historic Places
Historic districts on the National Register of Historic Places in New Jersey
Queen Anne architecture in New Jersey
Italianate architecture in New Jersey
Historic districts in Morris County, New Jersey